Juozas Urbšys (29 February 1896 – 30 April 1991) was a prominent interwar Lithuanian diplomat, the last head of foreign affairs in independent interwar Lithuania, and a translator. He served in the military between 1916 and 1922, afterwards joining the Lithuanian Ministry of Foreign Affairs. In 1938 Urbšys was named its head and served in this position until Lithuania's occupation in 1940. Urbšys was imprisoned by the Soviet authorities in 1940 and deported to Siberia, where he spent the next 13 years in various prisons. Urbšys died in 1991, having lived long enough to see Lithuania's independence restored, and was buried in Petrašiūnai Cemetery, Kaunas.

Biography

Juozas Urbšys was born on 29 February 1896 in Šeteniai, a village north of Kėdainiai. In 1907 Urbšys attended a school in Panevėžys, graduating in 1914. Soon afterwards he pursued his education in Riga, Latvia. The outbreak of World War I interrupted his studies and he enlisted in the army in 1916. A few years later, Urbšys completed his education at Chuguyevo Military School (now Chuhuiv in Ukraine), returning to Lithuania in 1918 after Lithuania re-established its independence. He continued to serve in the Lithuanian military until 1922.

After joining the foreign service, Urbšys worked in Berlin, Germany between 1922 and 1927. His next assignment was in Paris, France, a post he held until 1932. Urbšys was then named Lithuanian Minister Extraordinary and Plenipotentiary to Latvia, although he did not hold this position for long; in 1934 he was appointed the head of the political department in the Foreign Affairs Ministry. In 1938 he became the Lithuanian Minister of Foreign Affairs. Urbšys' service in this capacity coincided with significant international developments.

Rumors arose in 1939 that Nazi Germany would attempt to re-annex the Baltic Seaport city of Klaipėda from Lithuania (part of the Memelland region, the city and its surrounding area had until 1919 been part of the German province of East Prussia).  Urbšys had been representing Lithuania during the coronation of Pope Pius XII in Rome on 12 March; while returning to Lithuania, he stopped in Berlin in an attempt to clarify the rumors. On 20 March Ribbentrop, the German foreign minister, met with Urbšys. Ribbentrop demanded the cession of Klaipėda to Germany and threatened military action. Urbšys relayed the ultimatum to the Lithuanian government.  While a clear deadline was not given, Lithuania was told to make a speedy decision, and that any clashes or German casualties would inevitably provoke a response from the German military. Without any material international support, Lithuania had no choice but to accept the ultimatum. Lithuanian diplomats characterized the acceptance as a "necessary evil" that preserved its independence and hoped it was merely a temporary retreat.

Another major diplomatic development occurred during October 1939. During the course of a visit to the Soviet Union, Urbšys met with Vyacheslav Molotov, Chairman of the Council of People's Commissars and the People's Commissar for Foreign Affairs. Joseph Stalin joined the group soon afterwards. During the discussion a draft of a mutual assistance pact was presented, which resulted in the stationing of Red Army troops in Lithuania. The city of Vilnius and its surrounding region, which had been annexed by Poland in 1920, was returned to Lithuania. However, after about one year, the Soviet authorities presented an ultimatum that ended Lithuania's independence. Urbšys' career as foreign minister ended in 1940. Soviet authorities sent him initially to a prison in Tambov; he was later moved to prisons in Saratov, Ivanov and elsewhere. Of his 13 years in prison, 11 were spent in solitary confinement. He was released in 1954 without the right to live in what was now the Lithuanian SSR. He was allowed to return to Lithuania in 1956.

Urbšys continued to make his living by translating works in the French language into Lithuanian. He regained notability after publishing his memoirs in 1988, a work described as one of the first to address Lithuanian history under Soviet rule. After Lithuania again regained its independence, Urbšys was named an honorary citizen of Kėdainiai (in 1990) and Kaunas (1991). His health was frail, preventing him from fully participating in the political process of independence, but he enjoyed the authority and respect of the Lithuanian people. Urbšys died on 30 April 1991. After lying in state at the city of Kaunas' War Museum, he was entombed in Petrašiūnai Cemetery.

His last political action was performed on 23 August 1988, when his speech, recorded in a tape recorder, was played during a Sąjūdis rally. In the speech he narrated about the Soviet–Lithuanian Mutual Assistance Treaty signing in Moscow.

Close to his death, Urbšys was interviewed by a Swedish diplomat, who visited him on 9 September 1990 in his poor Soviet era flat that was located in the outskirts of the Kaunas city (soon after the declaration of the Act of the Re-Establishment of the State of Lithuania on 11 March 1990). When asked about the possible Lithuanian military resistance against the Soviet invasion in 1940, he said that it would have been impossible and that there is no reason to compare Lithuania situation with Finland, who fought the Winter War, because it had a much better geographical position, Karelia and Mannerheim Lines. He also noted that the resistance might have only made the horrific occupation conditions of the state even worse.

Two schools have been named for Juozas Urbšys: Kaunas 29th Secondary School and a school in Tiskūnai.

Awards

 Order of Vytautas the Great (Lithuania), Officer's Cross
 Order of the Lithuanian Grand Duke Gediminas (Lithuania), Commander's Grand Cross and Officer's Cross
 Royal Order of the Polar Star (Sweden), Commander 1st class (1935)

Works

Juozas Urbšys translated works by Georges Duhamel and Pierre Beaumarchais from French to Lithuanian, among others. His memoir, Lithuania During the Fatal Years, 1939-40, was published in 1988.

References

1896 births
1991 deaths
People from Kėdainiai District Municipality
Ministers of Foreign Affairs of Lithuania
Lithuanian people of World War II
Prisoners and detainees of the Soviet Union
Inmates of Vladimir Central Prison
Burials at Petrašiūnai Cemetery
Lithuanian Army officers